Schultz's pipefish, Corythoichthys schultzi, is a pipefish of the family Syngnathidae.

Etymology
The genus name Corythoichthys derives from the Greek words coris meaning "helmet" and ichthus meaning "fish". The specific name schultzi honors Leonard Peter Schultz, an American ichthyologist of the Smithsonian Institution (Washington).

Description
The body is cylindrical and very elongated. These pipefishes have a cryptic coloration making the difficult to be detected by both prey and predators. The basic color of the body is whitish, with small black, brown and reddish dashes and yellowish rings. The eyes are protruding and the snout is long, slightly compressed and thinner than the body. The caudal fin is present but quite small. Adults may form small aggregation. Ovoviviparous, the male carries the eggs in a brood pouch which is found under the tail. In this pouch they also carry the developing young pipefishes.

Distribution
This species is widespread throughout the Indo-Pacific Oceans, from Red Sea and East Africa to Tonga, throughout Micronesia, northern Australia and New Caledonia.

Habitat
Schultz's pipefish is a benthic species associated with coral reefs. The adults live in pairs or small groups when out in the open and find a safe places to spend the night.

References

 Biolib
 Gerald Allen, Roger Steene, Paul Humann & Ned Deloach Reef Fish Identification Tropical Pacific,  (New World Publications Inc, Jacksonville, Florida, US 2003) 
 Kaup J. J., 1853. Uebersicht der Lophobranchier. Arch. Naturgeschichte v. 19. 226-234.
Schultz, L. P., Herald, E. S., Lachner, E. A., Welander, A. D. & Woods, L. P., 1953. Fishes of the Marshall and Marianas islands. Vol. I. Families from Asymmetrontidae through Siganidae. Bulletin of the United States National Museum Núm. 202, v. 1: i-xxxii + 1-685, Pls. 1-74.
 Allen, G.R. i R.C. Steene, 1988. Fishes of Christmas Island Indian Ocean. Christmas Island Natural History Association, Christmas Island, Indian Ocean, 6798, Austràlia. 197 p.
Breder, C.M. i D.E. Rosen, 1966. Modes of reproduction in fishes. T.F.H. Publications, Neptune City, New Jersey, US. 941 p.
 Gell, F.R. i M.W. Whittington, 2002. Diversity of fishes in seagrass beds in the Quirimba Archipelago, northern Mozambique. Mar. Freshwat. Res. 53:115-121.
 Garpe, K.C. i M.C. Öhman, 2003. Coral and fish distribution patterns in Mafia Island Marine Park, Tanzania: fish-habitat interactions. Hydrobiologia 498: 191-211.
 Hoese, D.F., D.J. Bray, J.R. Paxton i G.R. Allen, 2006. Fishes. A Beasley, O.L. i A. Wells (eds.) Zoological Catalogue of Australia. Volum 35. ABRS & CSIRO Publishing: Australia Part 1, pp. xxiv 1-670; Part 2, pp. xxi 671-1472; Part 3, pp. xxi 1473-2178.
 Allen, G.R. i M. Adrim, 2003. Coral reef fishes of Indonesia. Zool. Stud. 42(1):1-72.
Fricke, R., 1999. Fishes of the Mascarene Islands (Réunion, Mauritius, Rodriguez): an annotated checklist, with descriptions of new species. Koeltz Scientific Books, Koenigstein, Theses Zoologicae, Vol. 31: 759 p.
 Kailola, P.J., 1987. The fishes of Papua New Guinea. A revised and annotated checklist. Vol. 1. Myxinidae to Synbranchidae. Research Bulletin Núm. 41. Department of Fisheries and Marine Resources, Port Moresby, Papua New Guinea. 194 p.
 Kuiter, R.H. i T. Tonozuka, 2001. Pictorial guide to Indonesian reef fishes. Part 1. Eels- Snappers, Muraenidae - Lutjanidae. Zoonetics, Australia. 302 p.
 Letourneur, Y., P. Chabanet, P. Durville, M. Taquet, E. Teissier, M. Parmentier, J.-C. Quéro i K. Pothin, 2004. An updated checklist of the marine fish fauna of Reunion Island, south-western Indian Ocean. Cybium 28(3):199-216.
 Masuda, H., K. Amaoka, C. Araga, T. Uyeno i T. Yoshino, 1984. The fishes of the Japanese Archipelago. Vol. 1. Tokai University Press, Tòquio, Japó. 437 p.
Murdy, E.O., C.J. Ferraris Jr., D.I. Hoese i R.C. Steene, 1981. Preliminary list of fishes from Sombrero Island, Philippines, with fifteen new records. Proc. Biol. Soc. Wash. 94(4):1163-1173.
 Nouguier, J. i D. Refait, 1990. Poissons de l'Océan Indien: les Iles Maldives. Réalisations Editoriales Pédagogiques, París. 304 p.
 Randall, J.E. i C. Anderson, 1993. Annotated checklist of the epipelagic and shore fishes of the Maldives Islands. Ichthyol. Bull. of the J.L.B. Smith Inst. of Ichthyol. 59:47.
 Werner, T.B i G.R. Allen, 1998. Reef fishes of Milne Bay Province, Papua New Guinea. A T. Werner i G. Allen (eds). A rapid biodiversity assessment of the coral reefs of Milne Bay Province, Papua New Guinea. RAP Working Papers 11, Conservation International, Washington DC.

Bibliography
 Dawson, C. E., 1977: Review of the pipefish genus Corythoichthys with description of three new species. Copeia 1977: 295-338.
 Dawson, C.E., 1985. Indo-Pacific pipefishes (Red Sea to the Americas). The Gulf Coast Research Laboratory Ocean Springs, Mississippi, US.
 Eschmeyer, William N.: Genera of Recent Fishes. California Academy of Sciences. San Francisco, California, US. iii + 697. . Any 1990.
 Eschmeyer, William N., ed. 1998. Catalog of Fishes. Special Publication of the Center for Biodiversity Research and Information, núm. 1, vol. 1-3. California Academy of Sciences. San Francisco, California, US. .
 Hardy, J.D. Jr., 2003. Coral reef fish species. NOAA\National Oceanographic Data Center. NODC Coral Reef Data and Information Management System. US. 537 p.
 Helfman, G., B. Collette i D. Facey: The diversity of fishes. Blackwell Science, Malden, Massachusetts, US, 1997.
 Lourie, S. A., Amanda C.J. Vincent i Heather J. Hall: Seahorses: An Identification Guide to the World's Species and their Conservation. Dorling Print Limited, Dorling House: London, Great Britain: Project Seahorse, 1999.
 Moyle, P. i J. Cech.: Fishes: An Introduction to Ichthyology, Upper Saddle River, New Jersey, US: Prentice-Hall. Any 2000.
 Nelson, Joseph S.: Fishes of the World, John Wiley & Sons. . Any 2006.
 Wheeler, A.: The World Encyclopedia of Fishes, London: Macdonald. Any 1985.

External links
 AQUATAB
 Aquaportail
 Australian Museum
 

Corythoichthys
Ovoviviparous fish
Fish described in 1953